Bodafors is a locality situated in Nässjö Municipality, Jönköping County, Sweden with 1,886 inhabitants as of 31 December 2010.

References

External links 

Populated places in Jönköping County
Populated places in Nässjö Municipality